Kanayalal Nanabhai Desai was an Indian Politician . He was elected to the Lower House of Parliament the Lok Sabha from Surat as a member of the Indian National Congress.

References

External links
Official biographical sketch in Parliament of India website

1896 births
India MPs 1952–1957
Indian National Congress politicians
Year of death missing
Indian National Congress politicians from Gujarat